Dorlan is a populated place in Chester County, Pennsylvania. It is located along Pennsylvania Route 282 north of Downingtown and just south of Marsh Creek State Park.  The place is referenced as an end point for the Struble Trail at Dorlan Mill Road.

References

Unincorporated communities in Chester County, Pennsylvania
Unincorporated communities in Pennsylvania